Nouakchott-Ouest is a region in Mauritania. It comprises the three northeastern departments of Mauritania's capital city Nouakchott: Ksar, Sebkha and Tevragh-Zeina. Its headquarters are at Tevragh-Zeina and the Presidential Palace is located within its borders.

Nouakchott-Ouest was created on 25 November 2014 when the region of Nouakchott was split into three new regions. Its wāli or governor is Mahi Ould Hamed, who was previously governor of Nouakchott Region.

References

Nouakchott
Regions of Mauritania
States and territories established in 2014
2014 establishments in Mauritania